Yaman Kalyan is a Hindustani classical raga, related to Yaman.  The movement of this raga is like Yaman, except that in the descent, it gently touches the flat madhyam using the GmG pattern occasionally.

Description 
Ustad Dhyanesh Khan used to say that the flat madhyam in Yaman Kalyan is like the beautiful face of a veiled woman that comes out of the veil occasionally but disappears behind it almost instantaneously.

As it is related to Yaman, it is a part of the Kalyan thaat.

Compositions 

 Bhavayami GopalaBalam by Annamacharya

Film Songs

Tamil

External links
 SRA on Samay and Ragas
 SRA on Ragas and Thaats

Hindustani ragas